The Untere Wildgrubenspitze (rarely Große Wildgrubenspitze) is the highest peak of the Lechquellen Mountains in Austria.

The summit may be reached from the Ravensburger Hut via the Schneegrube, Nadelscharte and southwest arête. This involves grade II to III climbing. The ascent from the northern side, from the Zürsersee is easier and protected with wire cables.

External links 

Two-thousanders of Austria
Mountains of the Alps
Lechquellen Mountains
Mountains of Vorarlberg